Egyptian War may refer to:

 First Anglo-Egyptian war (1807)
 Egyptian–Ottoman War (1831–33)
 Egyptian–Ottoman War (1839–41)
 Ethiopian–Egyptian War (1874–1876)
 Anglo-Egyptian War (1882)
 Libyan–Egyptian War (1977)
 Israeli-Egyptian War

Games
 Egyptian Ratscrew, card game